Manglia (Urdu: منگلیہ ) is a medium village of tehsil Kharian, District Gujrat, in the Punjab province of Pakistan. It is located at 32°86'N 73°97'E with an altitude of 271.5 metres). Manglia has many castes including Syed, Jutt, Awan, Malik, Mughal, and Kasbi.

Villages in Kharian Tehsil